Unending Degradation is the first studio album by Finnish death metal band Krypts. It was released on 19 February 2013 through Dark Descent Records. The album was made available on CD, vinyl and digital download.

Track listing

Personnel
Krypts
 Otso Ukkonen - Drums, guitars
 Ville Snicker - Guitars
 Antti Kotiranta - Vocals, bass, lyrics

Miscellaneous staff
 Timo Ketola - Cover art, additional artwork (Entwinement & Exhale), layout, logo
 Otso Ukkonen - Recording, mixing
 Samu Salovaara - Additional artwork (The Eye & The Urn)

References

2013 debut albums
Krypts albums